Pampa Sarovara is a lake in Koppal district near Hampi in Karnataka. To the south of the Tungabhadra River, it is considered sacred by Hindus and is one of the five sacred , or lakes in India. According to Hindu theology, there are five sacred lakes; collectively called Panch Sarovar; Mansarovar, Bindu Sarovar, Narayan Sarovar, Pampa Sarovar and Pushkar Sarovar. They are also mentioned in Shrimad Bhagavata Purana. In Hindu scriptures Pampa Sarovar is regarded as the place where Pampa, a form of Shiva's consort Parvati, performed penance to show her devotion to Shiva. It is also one of the Sarovar's that finds a mention in the Hindu epic, Ramayana as the place where Shabari, a devotee of Rama waited for the arrival of Ram.

Description
The Pampa Sarovar lake is located in a valley, hidden among the hills on the road to Anegundi from Hospet. It is about a kilometer from the foothills of the Hanuman Temple. The lake is filled with lotuses, and is really picturesque when the flowers are in bloom. There is a Lakshmi temple, as well as a Shiva temple facing the pond. Next to the pond, under a mango tree stands a small Ganesh shrine.

Related Scriptural Reference

In the Ramayana, Pampa Sarovar is mentioned as the place where Shabari (also Shabri), a disciple of the Rishi Matanga, directed Rama as he journeyed southwards on his quest to redeem Sita, his wife, from the demon King Ravana. According to the story, Shabari, a pious devotee of Rama, prayed faithfully everyday to see Rama. She lived in the ashram of her Guru Matanga in the place now known as Matanga Parvat in Hampi. Before her Guru Matanga Rishi died he told her she would certainly see Rama. After his death, Shabari continued to live in the ashram awaiting Rama. 13  years passed by and Shabari became an old woman and finally Lord Rama came to the place and stopped at the ashram on his journey to Lanka. She proceeded to feed Rama and his brother Lakshmana. Touched by her piety Rama and Lakshmana bowed down at her feet. Then, they narrated to her the incident of Sita's kidnapping and Shabari suggested that they seek help from Hanuman and Sugriva of the monkey kingdom who lived further south near the Pampa lake. Lord Rama took sacred bath in Matanga Lake.

See also
 Hampi
 Ramayana

Notes

Lakes of Karnataka
Places in the Ramayana
Sacred lakes of India
Tourist attractions in Karnataka
Hampi
Geography of Koppal district